PollyWorld is a 2006 animated comedy film from Universal Studios, based on the Polly Pocket toy franchise. It is the third Polly Pocket movie. It is preceded by Lunar Eclipse and 2 Cool at the Pocket Plaza. This is the only feature-length film in the series. The movie aired on Nickelodeon in the United States on November 12, 2006, and later Cartoon Network. It was released on DVD the following week.

Plot
Polly Pocket and her four friends get to be part of their favorite game show, 'Roll Like That', which puts teams of five through several challenges to win money for the charity of their choice.

As the challenges begin, however, Polly learns that her father is engaged to a woman named Lorelai, who secretly wants to get Polly out of the way. Polly and her friends also have to try to get past the scheming Beth, who teams up with Lorelai to get Polly to be sent to boarding school.

Faced with the prospect of losing everything she loves, her friends, family, and home, Polly decides to make this weekend the best ever.

Music
"Welcome To My World", performed by Michèle Vice-Maslin
"Smile", performed by Simply Red
"Perfect Kinda Day", performed by Sara Niemietz
"Another Word For Change", performed by Cassidy Ladden
"Every Day's a Holiday", performed by Robyn Newman
"Rock N' Roll Girl", performed by Jordan McCoy
"Rock This Town", performed by Cassidy Ladden
"Rock U Now", performed by Cassidy Ladden

Cast
Tegan Moss as Polly Pocket
Chiara Zanni as Shani, Polly's friend.
Nicole Bouma as Crissy, Polly's friend.
Natalie Walters as Lea, a redheaded athlete and Polly's friend; Caroline Hall, a popstar
 Brittney Wilson as Lila, a fashion forward friend of Polly.
Tabitha St. Germain as Beth, the mean girl; Karl and Lark, Swedish brother and sister in a student exchange program who only speak Swedish; and Dani
Jocelyne Loewen as Evie, one of Beth's friends; Stacey
Nicole Oliver as Tori, another one of Beth's friends; Amanda
Russell Roberts as Samuel, Polly's butler and driver.
Kathleen Barr as Lorelai, Polly's father's child-hating fiancée; Elevator Voice; Lexi; 'Roll Like That' Producer
Michael Donovan as John Pocket, Polly's dad; 'Roll Like That' Director
Alessandro Juliani as Donovan, host of 'Roll Like That'.
Teryl Rothery as Ms. Marklin; Lizzie
Andrew Francis as Rick, a boy who seems to have a crush on Polly.
Matt Hill as Todd, Rick's best friend; DJ
Danny McKinnon as Nathan; Waiter
Terry Klassen as Tech Guy for 'Roll Like That'

Reception

References

External links
 

2006 direct-to-video films
2006 animated films
Canadian children's animated films
American direct-to-video films
Curious Pictures films
American children's films
Direct-to-video animated films
Universal Pictures direct-to-video animated films
Universal Pictures direct-to-video films
Films based on Mattel toys
2000s American animated films
Canadian animated feature films
Canadian direct-to-video films
Canadian independent films
Animated films set in the United States
2006 films
2000s English-language films
2000s Canadian films